Valentina Poznyak (born 3 November 1936) is a Soviet swimmer. She took part in the 1960 Summer Olympics in the 100 m butterfly and 4×100 m medley relay, but did not reach the finals. Between 1957 and 1962 she won six national titles and set six national records in butterfly and medley relay events.

Since the introduction of masters tournaments in the Soviet Union in 1989 she competed in this category and won several national titles between 1989 and 1999.

References

1936 births
Living people
Russian female swimmers
Russian female butterfly swimmers
Swimmers at the 1960 Summer Olympics
Olympic swimmers of the Soviet Union
Soviet female swimmers
Universiade medalists in swimming
Universiade gold medalists for the Soviet Union